Luis Felipe Pinilla Astudillo (born 24 September 1997) is a Chilean footballer who plays as attacking midfielder or forward for Club Deportivo La Higuera.

Club career
In March 2019, Pinilla joined Deportes Limache. After being released from Fernández Vial, in 2022 he joined amateur Club Deportivo La Higuera from La Ligua, taking part in the 2022 Copa Chile.

International career
Along with Chile U20, he won the L'Alcúdia Tournament in 2015.

Honours
Universidad de Chile
 Copa Chile (2): 2012–13, 2015

Santiago Wanderers
 Copa Chile (1): 2017

Chile U20
 L'Alcúdia International Tournament (1): 2015

Career statistics

Club

References

External links
 
 Felipe Pinilla at playmakerstats.com (English version of ceroacero.es)

Living people
1997 births
People from Petorca Province
Chilean footballers
Chile under-20 international footballers
Universidad de Chile footballers
Deportes Iberia footballers
Santiago Wanderers footballers
Deportes Limache footballers
C.D. Arturo Fernández Vial footballers
Chilean Primera División players
Primera B de Chile players
Segunda División Profesional de Chile players
Association football forwards
Association football midfielders